is an original Japanese anime television series directed by Tomohisa Shimoyama, written by Dai Satō, and animated by Science SARU. It aired from July to September 2022. A webtoon adaptation with art by Digital Shokunin Studio has been serialized online via Line Corporation's Line Manga website since July of the same year.

Synopsis
The story takes place on Tom Sawyer Island, where everyone's lives revolve around the use of an augmented reality system known as Deco and a currency known as Love. Berry, an average girl with a damaged Deco that shows her things others can't see, meets Hack, a girl who looks like a boy. Charmed by Hack, Berry meets up with the team Hack leads, the Yurei Detective Club. Members of this club are "socially dead," working invisibly within the digitally controlled society of Tom Sawyer Island. As she works with the group, Berry learns about Phantom ZERO, a mysterious figure who lurks within Tom Sawyer's underground. She and Hack decide to chase down this figure, and in time, the truth behind the city is revealed...

Characters

Yurei Detective Club

A curious girl who is keen on solving the mystery behind Phantom ZERO. Due to a glitch in the DECO installed in her right eye, she is able to see things other normal citizens can't, leading to her encounter with Hack. After being declared dead following the rescue of Hack, she becomes a member of the Yurei Detective Club.

A child of unknown origin who uses a variety of gadgets such as cloaking devices and programmable paper airplanes. 

The head of the Yurei Detective Club.

A laid back member of the Yurei Detective Club.

An elderly woman who works with the Yurei Detective Club through a remotely controlled robot.

A young girl and member of the Yurei Detective Club who hides her face behind a gas mask. She is Madam 44's granddaughter.

A peculiar member of the Yurei Detective club who wears a suit and a large cat mask. He does not speak, and only occasionally writes sentences on his notepad.

Other characters

Berry's father, who works at the Customer Center as a content censor for Tom Sawyer Island.

Berry's mother, who works alongside Masial at the Customer Center.

Berry's classmate, who uses an apple-based avatar.

Berry's classmate, who uses an anteater-based avatar.

A mysterious figure at the heart of Tom Sawyer Island. While most know of Phantom Zero as a phantom thief wolfman from a video game, its actual appearance is of a woman with a glitched out face.

Media

Anime
The original anime series is animated by Science Saru and directed by Tomohisa Shiroyama, with scripts by Dai Sato. It aired from July 3 to September 18, 2022, on Tokyo MX, MBS, and BS NTV. The opening theme song is "1,000,000,000,000,000,000,000 LOVE" by Clammbon, and the ending theme song is "Aimuin Love" by Hack'nBerry (Mira Kawakatsu and Anna Nagase). Crunchyroll has licensed the series.

Episode list

Webtoon
A webtoon adaptation with art by Digital Shokunin Studio has been serialized online via Line Corporation's Line Manga website since July 8, 2022.

References

External links
  
 

Anime with original screenplays
Crunchyroll anime
Japanese webtoons
Medialink
Science Saru
Utopian fiction
Social reputation in fiction
Mass surveillance in fiction
Tokyo MX original programming